A magrodome is a sliding glass roof found aboard passenger ships. It can be opened and closed automatically depending on the weather and is often positioned over a swimming pool to offer an indoor-outdoor setting.

History
The primary purpose of the magrodome was to shelter the Lido pool area from inclement weather. The magrodome offered a method of covering the deck in case of rain or fog, while also allowing it to be opened in sunny conditions favorable to sunbathers.

Magrodomes have since been included in a number of modern cruise ships. Some traditional liners (such as Cunard's former flagship Queen Elizabeth 2) had a magrodome placed over an existing pool.

Notable vessels
Ms Birka Stockholm, completed in 2004, offers a unique indoor winter garden with a pool and artificial sun.
, completed in 1965, credited as the first passenger ship to feature a magrodome.
Queen Elizabeth 2 had a magrodome fitted over her quarterdeck pool during a 1985 refurbishment in Bremerhaven. This magrodome was later removed in a subsequent refit.
, completed in 2000,one of the first British based cruise ships to feature a magrodome.
, completed in 2003, the world's largest ocean liner, has a magrodome over the Pavilion Pool and Bar.

References 

Shipbuilding
Domes